NLRP10, short for NOD-like receptor family pyrin domain containing 10, is an intracellular protein of mammals that functions in apoptosis and the immune system.  It is also known as NALP10, NOD8, PAN5, Pynod, and CLR11.1, and is one of 14 pyrin domain containing members of the NOD-like receptor family of cytoplasmic receptors, although it differs from other NOD-like receptors by lacking the characteristic leucine-rich repeat domain. It is also believed that it helps regulate the inflammatory response. NLRP8 reduces inflammatory and innate immune responses by inhibiting the activity of two proteins associated with the inflammasome; caspase-1 and PYCARD.

References

Further reading

LRR proteins
NOD-like receptors
Genes on human chromosome 11